This is a list of parliamentary by-elections in the United Kingdom, with the names of the incumbent and victor and their respective parties.  Where seats changed political party at the election, the result is highlighted: red for a Labour gain, blue for a Conservative gain, orange for a Liberal gain, yellow for an SNP gain, green for a Plaid Cymru gain and grey for any other gain.

Resignations
See Resignation from the British House of Commons for more details.

Where the cause of by-election is given as "resignation" or "seeks re-election", this indicates that the incumbent was appointed on his or her own request to an "office of profit under the Crown", either the Steward of the Chiltern Hundreds or the Steward of the Manor of Northstead.  These appointments are made as a constitutional device for leaving the House of Commons, whose Members are not permitted to resign.

By-elections

See also
 List of United Kingdom by-elections (1979–2010)
 UK by-election records

References
United Kingdom Election Results (David Boothroyd)
United Kingdom Elections (Keele University)
British Parliamentary By-Elections since 1945

F. W. S. Craig, British Parliamentary Election Results 1950–73
F. W. S. Craig, British Parliamentary Election Results 1974–83
F. W. S. Craig, British Parliamentary Election Statistics 1832–1987
F. W. S. Craig, Chronology of British Parliamentary By-elections 1833–1987

1950
20th century in the United Kingdom